Hamadan Sugar Co (also Romanized as Hekmatan Sugar Co; also known as Hekmatan Sugar Co) is a village in Mohajeran Rural District, Lalejin District, Bahar County, Hamadan Province, Iran. At the 2006 census, its population was 169, in 46 families.

References 

Populated places in Bahar County